Veneziano Vital do Rêgo Segundo Neto (born 17 July 1970) is a lawyer and a federal senator of Brazil representing the state of Paraíba. Since February 2021, he has served as the first vice president of the Federal Senate. Vital do Rêgo is a member of the Brazilian Democratic Movement (MDB).

Personal life 
He is also the brother of federal deputy Vital do Rêgo Filho.

Political career 
Vital do Rêgo started his political career in 1996. He served two consecutive terms as a councillor in Campina Grande. In 2004, he was elected mayor of the city. In 2008, Vital do Rêgo was reelected for another term.

In the 2014 Brazilian general election, Vital do Rêgo was elected federal deputy. He received the second most votes in his state. In 2016, Vital do Rêgo lost in the election for mayor of Campina Grande. 

In 2018, Vital do Rêgo was elected senator in Paraíba. In April, he joined the Brazilian Socialist Party (PSB).

In February 2021, Vital do Rêgo was elected vice president of the Federal Senate. 40 votes were cast for him while 33 votes were cast for Senator Lucas Barreto (PSD).

Vital do Rêgo voted for the impeachment of Dilma Rousseff.

Vital do Rêgo was a candidate for governor of Paraíba in the 2022 elections.

In December 2022, Vital do Rêgo was unanimously elected vice-president of the Tribunal de Contas da União (Federal Court of Audits) and magistrate of the Court of Auditors.

References 

Living people
1970 births
Brazilian Democratic Movement politicians
Members of the Federal Senate (Brazil)
Members of the Legislative Assembly of Paraíba
Brazilian city councillors
20th-century Brazilian politicians
21st-century Brazilian politicians
People from Campina Grande